James Curran Davis (May 17, 1895 – December 18, 1981) was an American politician from the state of Georgia serving in the U.S. House of Representatives from 1947 to 1963. Davis unsuccessfully sought the presidential nomination at the 1956 Democratic National Convention.

Early life
Davis was born on May 17, 1895, in Franklin, Georgia to Viola (née Mooty) and Thomas Benjamin Davis. He attended Reinhardt College in Waleska, Georgia and Emory College in Oxford, Georgia. He was admitted to the bar in 1919 and started a practice in Atlanta.

Career
During World War I, Davis served in the United States Marine Corps as a private and sergeant from December 24, 1917, to January 11, 1919. He then served in the Judge Advocate General's Corps as a first lieutenant and captain.

He resumed practicing law after his military service. He served as a state representative of DeKalb County from 1924 to 1928. He then served as an attorney for the Georgia Department of Industrial Relations from 1928 to 1931 and DeKalb County from 1931 to 1934. He served as a judge of superior court in the Stone Mountain Judicial Circuit from 1934 to 1937.

Davis was a delegate to the 1948 Democratic National Convention. He was elected to represent Georgia's 5th congressional district in the House of Representatives as a Democrat. Davis served in Congress from January 3, 1947, to January 3, 1963.

Davis was a signatory to the 1956 Southern Manifesto, a document expressing the opposition of Southern congressional representatives to integration. At the 1956 Democratic National Convention in August, he received 33 votes for President. His nomination speech was given at the convention by Governor Marvin Griffin. He voted against the Civil Rights Act of 1957.

Later career
Davis was defeated in his bid for re-election to Congress in 1962 by Charles L. Weltner. He then resumed practicing law. He was the publisher for the Atlanta Times, a conservative newspaper led by Roscoe Pickett, from June 1964 to its closing in September 1965. He also served on the board of directors for the Salem Campground and De Kalb Federal Savings and Loan Association.

Personal life
Davis married Mary Lou Martin on December 26, 1932, in LaGrange, Georgia. She died in 1969. Together, they had one daughter, Mary Martin Davis.

He was a member of the Ku Klux Klan.

Death
Davis died in Atlanta on December 18, 1981. He is interred at Oak Hill Cemetery in Newnan.

References

External links
 James C. Davis papers (Emory University)

1895 births
1981 deaths
Reinhardt University alumni
Emory College alumni
American Ku Klux Klan members
American segregationists
Georgia (U.S. state) lawyers
Democratic Party members of the United States House of Representatives from Georgia (U.S. state)
Candidates in the 1956 United States presidential election
20th-century American politicians
Democratic Party members of the Georgia House of Representatives
Georgia (U.S. state) state court judges
20th-century American judges